is a Japanese 4-panel manga series written and illustrated by Komata Mikami, which began serialization in Houbunsha's Manga Time Kirara magazine from April 2008 issue. An anime television adaptation by Kinema Citrus aired in Japan between April and June 2013. An original video animation was released on February 22, 2017. The series' name is derived from the term .

Plot
The series follows the daily lives of three high school girls: the intelligent but childish Yuzuko, the kind but airheaded Yukari, and the mature and easily irritated Yui, who are all part of their school's . As the girls spend their days having meaningless discussions, they occasionally come up with topics to research while in their clubroom.

Characters

The first member of the Data Processing Club. Her nature is usually innocent, but will sometimes break out into outrageous bouts. Despite her dimwitted demeanour and crazy ideas, she is actually quite intelligent when it comes to the studies.

The second member of the Data Processing Club. A generally light headed girl who will often copy Yuzuko's antics if she finds them amusing. She comes from a rich family and was friends with Yui in elementary school.

The third member of the Data Processing Club. A generally serious girl who often serves as the straight person to the antics of Yuzuko and Yukari, who often like to tease her.

The girls' homeroom teacher and advisor of the Data Processing Club. She is often called  by her students due to her generally kind nature.

A classmate of the girls and the class president. She is a quiet girl who admires Yui a lot and wants to become friends with her, but is usually intimidated by Yuzuko and Yukari's antics.

A classmate of the girls and Chiho's friend. She is quite fond of Chiho and is often cold towards Yui for allegedly taking Chiho away from her.

A classmate of the girls and Chiho and Kei's friend. She is aware of Kei's fondness for Chiho and often teases her about it.

Media

Manga
The original manga by Komata Mikami began serialization in Houbunsha's Manga Time Kirara magazine from April 2008. The first tankōbon volume of the manga was released March 26, 2009, and twelve volumes have been published as of November 26, 2021.

Anime
The anime television adaptation is produced by Kinema Citrus and is directed by Kaori. Series composition is done by Natsuko Takahashi and character design by Hisayuki Tabata. The series aired between April 9 and June 26, 2013 and was simulcast with by Crunchyroll. Sentai Filmworks licensed the series in North America and released it on subtitled DVD on July 1, 2014. An original video animation episode was released in Japan on February 22, 2017.

Episode list

Video game
Characters from the series appear alongside other Manga Time Kirara characters in the 2017 mobile RPG, Kirara Fantasia.

References

External links
 Official anime website 
 

2008 manga
Anime series based on manga
Comedy anime and manga
Houbunsha manga
Kinema Citrus
NBCUniversal Entertainment Japan
Seinen manga
Sentai Filmworks
Slice of life anime and manga
Tokyo MX original programming
Yonkoma
School life in anime and manga